Fred Cooper (6 November 1934 – 1 April 1972) was an English professional footballer who played as a full-back.

Career

Cooper started his career as a member of the ground staff for West Ham United joining from school, aged fifteen, in 1949. He played and won honours with West Ham Boys, London boys and Essex boys teams and played in the first England Boys international at Wembley, conceding a penalty in the first few minutes against Scotland in a match which England won 8 - 2.

His West Ham footballing career started as a reserve player before making his first full appearance in the Southern Floodlight Cup, against Reading, in April 1956.
His league debut came in August 1956 in a 4–1 away defeat to Fulham. Making only 3 further league appearances Cooper retired from professional football to become the licensee at the Essex Arms in Stratford.

Cooper died in 1972.

References

1934 births
1972 deaths
English footballers
West Ham United F.C. players
English Football League players
Association football fullbacks
Footballers from the London Borough of Newham
West Ham United F.C. non-playing staff